Top Rope Promotions (formerly known as Yankee Pro Wrestling and South Coast Championship Wrestling) is a North Eastern independent professional wrestling promotion based in New Bedford, Massachusetts and is the largest promotion in the Southern New England area rivaling other North Eastern promotions including Chaotic Wrestling, the Millennium Wrestling Federation and New England Championship Wrestling. Along with its head trainer Matt Hyson, their seminars have been hosted by Ring of Honor alumni Jamie Noble and A.J. Styles. A number of independent wrestlers competed in Yankee Pro Wrestling during their early careers including Amanda Storm, Andy Jaxx, D. C. Drake, Slyck Wagner Brown, Johnny Heartbreaker, Shark Boy, Christian York, Metal Maniac, Robbie Ellis, Rick Fuller and Dan "The Beast" Severn.

Following the close of Extreme Championship Wrestling, several ECW mainstays such as Amish Roadkill, Dawn Marie, Simon Diamond, Perry Saturn, Tony DeVito, Little Guido, Jerry Lynn, Steve Corino, Justin Credible, Julio Dinero, Chris Hamrick, Big Dick Dudley and Joel Gertner had brief stints in the promotion. In recent years, TNA wrestlers Christy Hemme, Talia, Abyss, Jay Lethal, Joey Matthews, Ron "The Truth" Killings, Bubba Ray Dudley, and D-Von Dudley have also made appearances.

History
The promotion began holding events in the Fall River-New Bedford area during the early-1980s, picking up the old territorial area previously run by the World Wide Wrestling Federation during the 1970s. After going through several name changes and owners, the promotion changed its name from New England Wrestling Association to Yankee Pro Wrestling during the 1990s. During this time, the promotion gained a strong following in southern New England regularly bringing in former WWF stars from the 1980s and 90s. The promotion features many wrestlers who compete for Impact Wrestling or for ROH Wrestling. The promotion also features wrestlers who have or would go on to compete for the WWE.

The promotion was purchased by head booker Steve Ricard in 2000. Under the Top Rope Promotions banner, he continued running monthly shows in the Fall River-New Bedford area as both Yankee Pro Wrestling and South Coast Championship Wrestling, successfully making between $500–$5,000 a show. The majority of its shows are held at the PAL Hall in Fall River, Massachusetts and the Top Rope Arena in New Bedford, Massachusetts. The promotion also ran a weekly cable television program in the local area. In 2007, the names Yankee Pro Wrestling and South Coast Championship Wrestling ceased to be used and all events were now exclusively under the name Top Rope Promotions.

In addition to monthly events at the PAL Hall in Fall River, Top Rope Promotions runs events at the Creative Auction Centers in Fall River and New Bedford, the historic Adams-Turners Hall in Adams, and the Elks Lodge in Franklin. Top Rope Promotions also appears at the annual Whaling City Festival at Buttonwood Park in New Bedford and at the annual Wolcott Country Fair in Wolcott, Connecticut.  The promotion also holds annual events at Outdoor World campground in Sturbridge, Massachusetts, and also appears on occasion at The Wapping Fair in South Windsor Connecticut, however they have not been since 2008.

The Lock-Up Wrestling School

The school was founded by Top Rope Promotions owner Steve Ricard and former head trainer Matt Hyson (formerly known as Spike Dudley) in 2005. Hyson had been the school's head trainer from 2005 to 2013, The school is responsible for training several independent stars such as Teddy Goodz, T. K. O'Ryan, former Ring of Honor Television Champion, former Ring of Honor Tag Team Champion, former IWGP Tag Team Champion Matt Taven and Ring of Honor wrestler Vinny Marseglia. Top Rope Promotions veteran "H2O" Ryan Waters became one of the school's trainers in 2013 after Hyson left the promotion. In 2021 Lock-up graduate Nico Silva and New England veteran Elia Markopoulos joined Waters as co-trainers. Although he stepped down as the head trainer, Hyson is still on great terms with the promotion.

Special guest appearances

Bastion Booger
Bret "Hitman" Hart
Brutus Beefcake
Bubba Ray Dudley
The Bushwackers
Chad Toland
Devon Dudley
Diamond Dallas Page
Doink the Clown
Gangrel
George "The Animal" Steele
Greg "The Hammer" Valentine
"Hacksaw" Jim Duggan
Jeff Hardy
Jim "The Anvil" Neidhart
Jimmy "Superfly" Snuka
Junkyard Dog
Kamala
Mr. Anderson
King Kong Bundy
Koko B. Ware
Lou Albano
Luna Vachon
Marty Jannetty
Matt Hardy
Mr. Fuji
Nikolai Volkoff
The Nasty Boys
Perry Saturn
Rick "The Model" Martel
Ric Flair
"Rowdy" Roddy Piper
Scotty 2 Hotty
Spike Dudley
Steve Bradley
Stevie Richards
Tatanka
Teddy Long
Tito Santana
Tony Atlas
Virgil
WWE Tough Enough contestants
Christopher Nowinski
Jonah
Luke Robinson

Roster

Male wrestlers
Anthony Greene
Biff Busick
"The Devil's Reject" Brandon Webb
BRG
Cesar Leo
Channing Thomas
Craig Costa
Elia Markopoulos
Erik Chacha
Jaylen Brandyn
Jora Johl
Koosh Bandicoot
Matt Taven
Nico Silva
Matt Magnum
Pat Garrett 
Portuguese Power House (PPH)
"H2O" Ryan Waters
Swilly O'Brien
Teddy Goodz
Traevon Jordan
”The Difference” Tyler Brooks
Vinny Marseglia
Wildman Kongo

Female wrestlers
Alexxis
LMK
Luscious Latasha
Sarah Jade

Managers
”Former WWF Hall of Famer” Sidney Bakabella

"The Adorable one” Gene Joseph years active 1998-2012

Marshall McNeil Years active 2011-2018

Tag teams/stables
Beastmasters (PPH and Pat Garrett)
ChaCha and Koosh
Waves N Curls (Traevon Jordan and Jaylen Brandyn)
World Class (Channing Thomas and Sydney Bakabella)

Others

Steve Ricard (owner, promoter)
Howilton Davis (ring announcer; play-by-play announcer)
Scott Robinson (Referee)
Tony P(Referee)
Jon Roy (Referee/Production)
Ryan Drew, Nico Silva, and Elia Markopoulos (Lock-up Academy Coaches)

Championships and accomplishments

Accomplishments

See also
List of independent wrestling promotions in the United States

References

External links

CageMatch.de - Top Rope Promotions 

American companies established in 1984
Companies based in Massachusetts
Independent professional wrestling promotions based in Massachusetts